Jiří Jeslínek may refer to:

 Jiří Jeslínek (footballer born 1962), Czechoslovak international footballer
 Jiří Jeslínek (footballer born 1987), Czech footballer